Munshi Hakimuddin (1839–1894) was Chief Secretary at Bhopal state during the period of Nawab Shah Jahan Begum.

Biography
Munshi Hakimuddin was 'Meer Munshi-e Riyasat Bhopal' (Chief Secretary of the Bhopal state) and hence popularly known as 'Munshi Hakimuddin'. He was from famous Alavi family of Tijara. He started his career as Mohtamim (Secretary) of 'Adalat-e- Diwani'. He acquired a distinguished position and status right from the days of Nawab Sikander Jahan Begum.

He was born on 11 Rajab 1251 AH / 1839 AD at Tijara.

Books
Being a poet and author, he penned and edited many books. Few books are: 
 Masnavi Zahr-i Ishq by Mirza Shauq Lakhnavi

Marriage and children
He was married to Sharifun Nisan, daughter of Ghulam Mustafa of Jhajjar and had three sons Hafiz Mazhar Husain, Naziruddin and Bashiruddin.

Munir Bhopali

Muniruddin 'Munir' was the son of Bashiruddin. Bashiruddin died before the birth of his son Muniruddin 'Munir', popularly known as 'Munir Bhopali' Muniruddin was born in Bhopal on Ramadan 1304 AH/ 1887 AD. He grew up under the care of grandfather Munshi Hakimuddin until 8 years. After hearing his birth, Sultan Shah Jahan, Begum of Bhopal ordered a Mansab of Rs. 30 per month, which he got until the employment. He was a great scholar and poet.

Family history
Munshi Hakimuddin is direct descendant of 'Syed Ghazi Maroofuddin' who is Uncle of Ghazi Saiyyad Salar Masud. Munshi Hakimuddin was the son of Amanul Haq (died on 13 Sha'aban 1255 AH/1839 AD at Nagpur). 
Amanul Haq ibn
Shamsul Haq ibn 
Najmul Haq ibn 
Mian Abdur Rahman (Amanul Haq was married to Nasibun Nisan, daughter of Abdul Qayyum ibn Ghulam Nabi) ibn 
Abdul Haadi ibn 
Mohammad Ibrahim Qazi ibn 
Qazi Mehmood ibn 
Qazi Mohammad ibn 
Qazi Ziauddin ibn 
Qazi Abdullah ibn 
Qazi Fatehullah ibn 
Qazi Rizaqullah ibn 
Qazi Raffiuddin ibn 
Qazi Rukanuddin ibn 
Ghazi Shah Abdullah ibn 
Shah Ghazi Maroofuddin ( Ghazi Maroofuddin was brother of Syed Salar Sahu).

Shareef Qazi-e Aazam ibn Qazi Ziauddin of Pinangwan was 'Qazi Qadaa' (authority to appoint Qazi). Akbar on 4 Jumada al-Thani 976 AH / 1568 awarded him 2000 Bigha Arazi Swad at Tijara. Qazi Mahmood (died 1005 AH / 1596 AD) was the son of Hākim-e Shariah Shareef Qazi-e Aazam. His brother Mohammad Hashim, his son Abdul Hafeez and grandson Ghulam Naqsh Band had also received many Firman (decree) like Qazi Mahmood.  Ibrahim son of Qazi Mahmood was also 'Qazi Qadaa' at Tijara. Shahjahan awarded him Firman (decree) first on 22 Dhu al-Hijjah 1054 AH (Juloos 18) and second on 19 Ramadan 1055 AH. Some parts of his ruined haveli is still seen at Tijara. He died on 5 Moharram 1074 AH / 1665 AD. Qazi Abdul Baqi son of Qazi Ibrahim had also close relations with the Durbar of Aurangzeb and had given him charge of appointing 'Qazi' at Tijara. As per the Firman (decree) of Aurangzeb sealed by 'Sadr Sadoor Abid Khan', he was awarded Sanad of Qadaa. He also built various orchards and Havelis like Haveli Kalan, Deewan Khana, Kothi Bagh etc. at Tijara. He had business of horses from Arabian breed. The main gates at the Qazi Mohallah were built by him. In the archive of Tahsil Tijara, dated 1070 AH shows the 'Mafi Bagh' in the name of Qazi Abdul Baqi.[2]

Qazi Abdul Baqi had two sons Qazi Ghulam Mohiuddin and Qazi Ghulam Murtaza and died on 30 Jumada al-awwal 1113 AH / 1701 AD. The elder daughter of Qazi Abdul Baqi was married to Abu Saeed bin Abdul Ghaffar of Sakras, while the younger daughter Khwanda Daulat Bint was married to Syed Chajju of Mohina.

Munshi Hakimuddin died on 15 Sha'aban 1312 AH/1894 AD

See also 
Ghulam Mansoor

References 

People from Tijara
1839 births
Indian Muslims
Politicians from Bhopal
1894 deaths